Gateway, California may refer to:
Gateway, Los Angeles County, California
Gateway, Nevada County, California
Gateway, San Diego, California